The College of Natural Science (NatSci) at Michigan State University is home to 27 departments and programs in the biological, physical and mathematical sciences.

The college averages $51M in research expenditures annually and claims to have more than 6,500 undergraduate majors and nearly 1,000 graduate students. There are 730 faculty and academic staff associated with NatSci and more than 47,000 living alumni worldwide.

Departments and programs
Departments
Biochemistry and Molecular Biology
Chemistry
Computational Mathematics, Science and Engineering
Earth and Environmental Sciences
Mathematics
Microbiology and Molecular Genetics
Physics and Astronomy
Physiology
Plant Biology
Statistics and Probability
Integrative Biology

Additional Units
Actuarial Science (Program)
Advanced Microscopy (Center)
Biological Sciences (Program)
Biomedical Laboratory Diagnostics (Program)
Cell and Molecular Biology (Program)
Charles Drew Science Scholars (Program)
Ecology, Evolutionary Biology and Behavior (Program)
Environmental Science and Public Policy (Program)
Genetics (Program)
CREATE for STEM (Institute)
Integrative Studies in General Science (Center)
Kellogg Biological Station (Program)
Mathematics Education (Program)
Neuroscience (Program)
Plant Research Lab (Program)
Quantitative biology (Program)
Residential Initiative on the Study of the Environment (Program)

Undergraduate studies
The college offers both Bachelor of Science (BS) and Bachelor of Arts (BA) degrees.

 The BS requires more science and mathematics credits and less non-science, humanities and social science coursework in the 120-credit program. The BS is intended for individuals preparing for professional work in the sciences or for graduate/professional school.
 The BA is designed for individuals pursuing K-12 teaching careers or scientific application areas such as public policy, technical sales, law, and communications. The BA requires more humanities and social science credits, thus providing greater balance between science and non-science credits in the 120 credit program.

Majors in the college include:
 Biochemistry and Molecular Biology 
 Biological Science (Interdepartmental; For teaching majors only) 
 Biomedical Laboratory Diagnostics (formerly titled Medical Technology Program) 
 Clinical Laboratory Science
 Diagnostic Molecular Science
 Medical Technology
 Chemical Physics
 Chemistry 
 Computational Chemistry 
 Earth Science
 Environmental Studies 
 Environmental Biology/Plant Biology
 Environmental Biology/Microbiology
 Environmental Biology/Zoology
 Specialization in Environmental Studies
 Geological Sciences 
 Environmental Geosciences
 Geological Sciences
 Geophysics
 Human Biology
 Mathematics 
 Actuarial Science Specialization
 Computational Mathematics 
 Mathematics 
 Microbiology and Molecular Genetics 
 Genomics and Molecular Genetics
 Nutritional Science
 Physical Science (Interdepartmental; For teaching majors only) 
 Physics and Astronomy 
 Astrophysics
 Physics
 Physics and Geophysics
 Physiology
 Plant Biology 
 Environmental Biology/Plant Biology 
 Preprofessional Coursework (Pre-med, etc.) 
 Statistics
 Zoology

Dean's Research Scholars
The Dean's Research Scholars are a group of outstanding undergraduate students who represent the nearly 5,000 hard-working science and mathematics majors in the College of Natural Science.

Scholars are named for a 12-month term from May through the following May. During that time, scholars will participate in the following:
 2-4 College of Natural Science events or speaking engagements;
 Attend an orientation meeting on being a Dean's Research Scholar in August (usually the Monday or Tuesday before classes begin);
 Attend the NatSci Alumni Awards program;
 Participate in a panel discussion during Classes Without Quizzes;
 Write a student point-of-view during the school year for posting in MSU Today.

Criteria for becoming a Dean's Research Scholar
 Scholars must be enrolled full-time (12 or more credits/semester) in a major in the College of Natural Science (Lyman Briggs majors are not eligible). Students may have additional majors in other colleges, but their primary major must be in Natural Science.
 Scholars must have completed at least one semester of research with an MSU faculty mentor (the faculty mentor can be from any college, not just Natural Science) prior to application.

RISE and Drew Scholars
Two special undergraduate programs are in place for students:
RISE or Residential Initiative on the Study of the Environment is for MSU students interested in stewardship of the environment.

Charles Drew Science Scholars is a program providing academic and social support for high achieving students pursuing science and math degrees, including individuals interested in professional health and science careers, such as, medicine, veterinary medicine, dentistry, research, pharmacology, optometry, physical therapy, and public health.

Study Abroad, Study Away
NatSci also offers a Study Abroad and Study Away off-campus programs in:
 Africa – Kenya, Tanzania, Uganda,
 Americas – Ecuador, Galapagos Islands, Costa Rica, Virgin Islands
 Antarctica
 Asia – India, Borneo
 Europe – Germany, United Kingdom, Switzerland
 Oceania – Australia, New Zealand
 Florida – Orlando, Gainesville
 Hawaii
 Alaska
 Michigan – Upper Peninsula, Isle Royale, Battle Creek

Graduate studies
Advanced study is available through the following degree programs and specializations:
 Astrophysics and Astronomy
 Biochemistry and Molecular Biology
 Biomedical Laboratory Diagnostics
 Cell and Molecular Biology
 Cell, Molecular, and Structural Biology
 Chemistry
 Cognitive Science
 Ecology, Evolutionary Biology, and Behavior
 Entomology
 Environmental Science and Policy
 Environmental Toxicology
 Food Science
 Genetics
 Geological Sciences
 Human Nutrition
 Mathematics
 Microbiology and Molecular Genetics
 Neuroscience
 Pharmacology and Toxicology
 Physics
 Physiology
 Plant Biology
 Quantitative Biology and Modeling
 Science and Mathematics Education
 Statistics and Probability
 Certification in Teaching College Science and Mathematics
 Zoology

Professional Science Masters (PSM) programs

The College of Natural Science offers several PSM degrees to prepare and train students in technical areas for positions in industry. The PSM is a professional M.S. degree in science or mathematics for students interested in a wider variety of career options than provided by current graduate programs in the sciences and mathematics.

The three areas of program development include: 
 In-depth technical training in a science discipline, 
 College certification of training in basic business practice including communication and presentation skills, 
 Industrial internship or industrial case studies, developed in cooperation with industrial affiliates.

PSM Programs:
 Biomedical Laboratory Operations 
 Food Safety  
 Industrial Mathematics 
 Integrative Pharmacology 
 Zoo & Aquarium Science

Science and mathematics teachers
NatSci offers master's degrees and certificates for science and mathematics teachers. These programs are coordinated with MSU's College of Education. For Mathematics Education, the program is administered by Program for Mathematics Education, or PRIME. For Science Education, the program is administered by the Center for Integrative Studies in General Science, or CISGS, under the "Integrated Science Education" area.

Research centers, institutes and facilities

The college has a variety of resources available to researchers.
BEACON: Biocomputational Evolution in Action Consortium
Institute for Research on Mathematics and Science Education
Center for Microbial Ecology
Center for Statistical Training and Consulting
Center for the Study of Cosmic Evolution
Composite Materials and Structure Center
Institute for Quantum Sciences
Joint Institute for Nuclear Astrophysics
National Food Safety and Toxicology Center
Albert J. Cook Arthropod Research Collection
Center for Advanced Microscopy
Herbarium
High Performance Computing Center
Kellogg Biological Station
 Max T. Rogers NMR Facility
MSU/DoE Plant Research Laboratory
National Superconducting Cyclotron Laboratory
Protein Expression Laboratory
Research Technology Support Facility
SOAR Telescope

Administration

Phillip M. Duxbury is dean of Michigan State University's College of Natural Science (NatSci).

Prior to his appointment as dean, Duxbury served as chair of the Department of Physics and Astronomy (PA) from August 2013 until August 2018. He joined the MSU faculty in 1986 as an assistant professor, was promoted to associate professor in 1994 and became a full professor in 1998. During his MSU tenure, Duxbury has also served as PA graduate studies director, associate director of the MSU Center for Fundamental Materials Research, director of the Center for Nanomaterials Design and Assembly, and director of the Center of Research Excellence in Complex Materials. He is a Fellow of the American Physical Society.

Duxbury's specialties include statistical physics, solar device models, ultrafast processes and accelerator physics. His research focuses on ultrafast nanocrystallography and applications to ultrafast processes in materials; phase behavior of polymer-nanoparticle mixtures with applications to organic and perovskite solar cells; phase behavior of nanoparticle-lipid bilayer systems with applications to nanotoxicology; and finding the atomic structure of non-crystalline materials, such as isolated nanoparticles and complex molecules, involving the definition and solution of novel inverse problems. Duxbury's research is funded by grants from the National Science Foundation. He is also co-PI of a workforce development project in Accelerator Science and Technology funded by the Department of Energy.

Education:

Ph.D.  (physics) University of New South Wales, Sydney, Australia.

B.S. (physics) University of Western Australia, Perth, Australia

References

Michigan State University